Peshraw Azizi, born 19 January 1988 in Sulaymaniyah, Iraq, plays as a centre back for Vasalunds IF.

Early years
Peshraw's family comes from the city of Baneh in the Kurdistan Province, Iran. After the Iranian revolution, his father Ali hoped for a better future but soon realized that his only path to freedom was to join the Kurdish guerrillas and become Peshmerga. Peshraw's father became politically active, the family settled 60 km away across the "border" in the city of Sulaymaniyah (Iraqi Kurdistan) and where Peshraw was born on Thursday, January 19, 1988.

When Pasha was 11 years old, the Azizi family decided it was time to leave Kurdistan, and in 2000, the family landed at Arlanda and settled in Rönninge outside Stockholm. His football career took off immediately and quite immediately after Pasha came to Sweden, he visited the local club Rönninge/Salem Fotboll.

Career

Dalkurd FF
Azizi joined Dalkurd FF in February 2011. In December 2016, Azizi's contract was extended to the end of the 2019 season. On 2 November 2019 Dalkurd confirmed, that Azizi would leave the club at the end of the year.

Vasalunds IF
In 2020, Azizi moved to Vasalunds IF on a free transfer. He signed a contract extension with the club at the end of February 2021.

Personal life
Azizi has acquired Swedish nationality, but in 2014 began returning to Kurdistan each year during the Swedish association football off-season. During one such visit, he signed a three-month contract to play for Zeravani SC in the Kurdish League. However, his main reasons for visiting Iraqi Kurdistan are humanitarian. During the summer of 2015, he and a few friends gathered  (US$) in Sweden, and then traveled to Kurdistan to apply the funds to charitable projects, such as distributing basic necessities and planting food crops. He is also involved with Dalkurd FF in social projects in their own city of Borlänge, Sweden.

References

External links 
 

1988 births
Living people
Iraqi footballers
Swedish footballers
Swedish people of Kurdish descent
Swedish people of Iraqi descent
Kurdish sportspeople
Syrianska FC players
Dalkurd FF players
Vasalunds IF players
Superettan players
Ettan Fotboll players
People from Sulaymaniyah
Association football midfielders